The fourth season of the Greek reality show Just the 2 of Us began airing on October 17, 2020 for the second time on Open TV.

Host Nikos Koklonis and judges Despina Vandi, Maria Bakodimou, Stamatis Fasoulis and Vicky Stavropoulou, from the previous season all returned. Laura Karaiskou replaced Vicky Kavoura as the new backstage host.

Like in the previous season, 14 contestants participated on the show. This season all shows were aired live.

On December 26, 2020, Nassos Papargyropoulos and Josephine were declared the winners. Katerina Zarifi and Anastasios Rammos, and Zoi Dimitrakou and Lefteris Pantazis came in second place.

Judges
Despina Vandi, singer, actress.
Maria Bakodimou, television presenter.
Stamatis Fasoulis, actor.
Vicky Stavropoulou, actress.

Couples
It was announced that Piyi Devetzi would participate this season with Efi Sarri, but some days before the premiere of the show, Devetzi was positive with coronavirus. She was replaced by Trifonas Samaras. Since the second week, Rachel Makri couldn't took anymore place in the show, because she had an accident and she was replaced by Evridiki Valavani.

Scoring chart

Red numbers indicate the lowest score for each week
Green numbers indicate the highest score for each week
 the couple eliminated that week
 the returning couple finishing in the bottom two/three
 indicates the couple which was immune from elimination
 the winning couple
 the runner-up couple
 the third-place couple

Average score chart 
This table only counts for performances scored on a traditional 40-points scale.

Weekly scores

Week 1: Launch show
In the first week, the judges didn't voted, as it was the first show and also nobody was eliminated.

Week 2

Week 3

Week 4

Week 5

Week 6

Week 7: Eurovision Night

Week 8: Greek Cinema Night

Week 9: 80's Night

Week 10: Semi final

Week 11: Final

Ratings

References

External links
 Official website of Just the 2 of Us

2020 Greek television seasons